Singapore - Turkey relations are the bilateral relations between Singapore and Turkey. Diplomatic relations between the two countries were established on 12 February 1969. Singapore has an embassy in Ankara. Turkey has an embassy in Singapore.

Economic Relations

Primary export products of Turkey includes iron and steel; mineral fuel oils; furniture bedding, lamps, fittings; boilers and parts; articles of apparel and accessories knitted. Turkish imports are mainly composed of postal packages and special transactions; electrical machinery and appliances; aluminum and plastic products.

During a visit by Singapore President SR Nathan to Turkey in 2009, the Union of Chambers and Commodity Exchanges of Turkey- Foreign Economic Relations Board (TOBB-DEIK) and Singapore Business Federation (SBF) concluded an agreement on the establishment of Turkey-Singapore Business Council. The council aims to promote bilateral trade between the two countries, as well as develop industrial and technological cooperation. Turkey and Singapore have agreements for “Avoidance of Double Taxation and Prevention of Fiscal Evasion with Respect to Taxes on Income” and “Reciprocal Promotion and Protection of Investments”.

Bilateral trade hit a record high in 2011 with total trade reaching S$2.2 billion in 2011, a 79 per cent increase from the previous year.

An FTA between both nations was signed in November 2015 and entered into force in October 2017 during the G20 Summit that year.

State visits
In 2012, Turkish Deputy Prime Minister Ali Babacan visited Singapore where he met with Singapore President Tony Tan, Deputy Prime Minister Tharman Shanmugaratnam, Minister of Foreign Affairs K. Shanmugam and Minister for Trade and Industry Lim Hng Kiang. The two leaders agreed to further deepen bilateral cooperation across different sectors including trade, investments and finance. During the meetings, the leaders acknowledged the excellent state of bilateral relations between Singapore and Turkey.  Babacan warmly welcomed Singapore's intention to open an embassy in Ankara later that year. They also exchanged views on regional developments in Asia and the Middle East.

H.E. President Erdoğan, then in his capacity as Prime Minister, visited Singapore on 8–9 January 2014. H.E. Prime Minister Lee visited Turkey on 12–15 October 2014. Prime Minister H.E Binali Yıldırım paid an official visit to Singapore on 21–22 August 2017.

Migration
There are 500 Turkish citizens based in Singapore and over 50 Turkish companies registered in Singapore.

References

External links

 
Turkey
Bilateral relations of Turkey